NGC 379 is a lenticular galaxy in the constellation Pisces. It was discovered on September 12, 1784 by William Herschel. It was described by Dreyer as "pretty faint, small, round, brighter middle".

References

External links
 

0379
00683
MCG objects
003966
Lenticular galaxies
17840912
Pisces (constellation)